Arimondo Silvio, called Alimondo Ciampi (18 December 1876 in San Mauro a Signa – 8 December 1939 in Florence) was an Italian sculptor.

References
Marco Moretti, Bruno Catarzi Scultore 1903–1996, Masso delle Fate Edizioni, Signa, 2005, 
Giampiero Fossi, Oltre il novecento – Arte contemporanea nelle Signe, Masso delle Fate Edizioni, Signa, 2003, 
Arnolfo Santelli, Un artista gentiluomo – Vita e Viatico di Giuseppe Santelli, Soc. Leonardo da Vinci di Firenze, 1974
Marco Moretti, Alvaro Cartei – Il percorso di un artista solitario tra i fermenti del suo tempo – Pittura e Grafica 1925–1995, Masso delle Fate Edizioni, Signa, 

People from Signa
1876 births
1939 deaths
20th-century Italian sculptors
20th-century Italian male artists
Italian male sculptors